Gardone Riviera is a town and comune in the province of Brescia, in Lombardy. It is situated on the western shore of Lake Garda.

Twin towns
Gardone Riviera is twinned with:

  Arcachon, France, since 1980
  Pescara, Italy, since 2010

Main sights
 The Vittoriale degli Italiani is a former residence of the poet Gabriele D'Annunzio. He donated it to the Italian State before his death. It is now a national monument and houses a MAS fast military ship and the plane on which D'Annunzio raided Vienna. 
 The English band King Crimson recorded in its auditorium the songs "Three of a Perfect Pair" and "Blastic Rhino" for the album Heavy ConstruKction recorded (June 21, 2000).
 The Giardino Botanico Fondazione André Heller is a botanical garden maintained by artist André Heller.

Sources

External links

Gardone picture gallery

Cities and towns in Lombardy
Populated places on Lake Garda